WYRB (106.3 FM), known locally as Power 106 is a rhythmic contemporary radio station serving Rockford, Illinois, licensed to nearby Genoa. It is owned by Crawford Broadcasting.

Up until June 2010, WYRB was a simulcast of Chicago's WSRB and offered an Urban AC format. However, realizing that there was a hole for a Rhythmic format in Rockford and at the same time tapping into an audience looking for another alternative to Top 40/CHR WZOK, Crawford decided to split up the simulcast and refocus WYRB on the Rockford area as a Rhythmic Top 40 rather than as an Urban Contemporary. According to Sales Manager DiAnna Cantele Mazzola, “They identified that R&B wasn’t taking off and felt there was a niche to be filled for the urban market,” and added “Now it’s today’s hits and hip-hop, and club music that really doesn’t get played a lot.”

WYRB broadcasts in HD.

References

External links
www.mypower106.com

YRB
Rhythmic contemporary radio stations in the United States
Radio stations established in 1977